Lewis Minor Carson (August 12, 1941 – October 20, 2014) was an American actor, screenwriter, director and film producer.

Career
Carson first gained the notice of the film world when he starred in Jim McBride's mockumentary David Holzman's Diary in 1967 as the title character, a man so obsessed with filmmaking that he allows his obsession to take over his life and ruin his relationships. The two teamed up again in the early 1980s, sharing screenplay credits for the 1983 remake of Breathless; this starred Richard Gere, Valérie Kaprisky and, in a bit part, Carson's brother David Lee Carson as Mister Maurice. Kit Carson's break-out accomplishment was co-writing, with Sam Shepard, the screenplay for the 1984 film Paris, Texas, which featured his son Hunter Carson in his film debut. Kit Carson also penned the screenplay for the 1986 horror satire The Texas Chainsaw Massacre 2.

Personal life and death
Carson had a son, actor Hunter Carson, with his former wife Karen Black, to whom he was married from 1975 until 1983. L. M. Kit Carson died in his sleep of pneumonia on October 20, 2014, in his native Dallas, Texas, aged 73.

Filmography

Films
David Holzman's Diary (1967) - actor
The American Dreamer (with Lawrence Schiller) (1971) - director 
Breathless (1983) - writer
Paris, Texas (1984) - writer
The Texas Chainsaw Massacre 2 (1986) - writer
Running on Empty (1988) - actor
Hurricane Streets (1997) - actor
Bullfighter (2000) - writer, producer
CQ (2001) - actor
Perfume (2001) - writer, producer

Television
Miami Vice - Season 5 Episode 13, "The Cell Within" - actor

References

External links

1941 births
2014 deaths
American male film actors
American male screenwriters
American male television actors
Deaths from pneumonia in Texas
Film producers from Texas
Jesuit College Preparatory School of Dallas alumni 
Male actors from Dallas
Screenwriters from Texas
University of Dallas alumni